Group B was one of the two groups of the 2018 AFF Championship. It consisted of Thailand, Indonesia, the Philippines, Singapore and qualification round winners Timor-Leste. The matches were played from 9 to 25 November 2018.

Teams

Group standings 

In the semi-finals:
Thailand advanced to play against Malaysia (runners-up of Group A).
Philippines advanced to play against Vietnam (winners of Group A).

Matches

Singapore vs Indonesia

Timor-Leste vs Thailand

Indonesia vs Timor-Leste

Philippines vs Singapore

Timor-Leste vs Philippines

Thailand vs Indonesia

Philippines vs Thailand

Singapore vs Timor-Leste

Thailand vs Singapore

Indonesia vs Philippines

References

External links 
 AFF Suzuki Cup 2018 – Official website

Group stage